Heze is a prefecture-level city in southwestern Shandong, China.

Heze may also refer to:

Heze, the proper name of the primary component of the binary star Zeta Virginis in the constellation of Virgo
Heze Shenhui (684-758), a Chinese Buddhist monk 
Heze school of Chinese Chan Buddhism during the Tang Dynasty 
Heze, a Type 056 corvette

See also
Rowwen Hèze, Dutch band